Blue Tree is a boutique on the Upper East Side of New York City, opened by former actress Phoebe Cates.

Background
The store sells jewelry, clothing, antiques, perfume, candles, art, photography, books, vintage LPs, and stuffed animals.

The New York Times referred to the store as "a version of Elizabeth Street for the Carnegie Hill crowd, a little oasis of downtown aesthetic at Ladies Who Lunch prices," and said that "the celebrity boutique is a way for famous people to admit the civilian into their universe; it is a presentation of themselves, their likes and desires, their preferences—and does not require them to step in front of a camera."

Cates stated "I always wanted to have a general store." Cates also said that some of her customers tell her that she looks like Phoebe Cates, and that she responds to them by saying "I get that a lot."

The name of the store was suggested by Kevin Kline, Cates' husband. The store's name is a reference to the blue trees in Fauvist paintings; with the idea being that just as blue trees seem out of place in a forest, a store like Blue Tree seems out of place on the Upper East Side.

References

External links

Phoebe Cates talks about Blue Tree, interview on CNBC

Retail companies established in 2005
Retail companies of the United States
Shops in New York City
Commercial buildings in Manhattan